Michael Jarboe Sheehan (born July 9, 1939) is an American prelate of the Catholic Church who served as the eleventh archbishop of the Archdiocese of Santa Fe in New Mexico from 1993 to 2015.  He previously served as bishop of the Diocese of Lubbock in Texas from 1983 to 1993.

Biography

Early life 
Michael Sheehan was born on July 9, 1939, in Wichita, Kansas to John and Mildred (née Jarboe) Sheehan, and raised in Texarkana, Texas. He attended both St. John's High School Seminary and Assumption Seminary in San Antonio, Texas. He then furthered his studies in Rome at the Pontifical Gregorian University, where he obtained a Licentiate of Sacred Theology in 1965.

Priesthood 
Sheehan was ordained to the priesthood for the Diocese of Dallas-Fort Worth in Rome by Archbishop Martin O’Connor on July 12, 1964. Upon his return to Texas, he served as parochial vicar at Immaculate Conception Parish in Tyler from 1965 to 1968. Returning to Rome, he earned a doctorate in canon law from the Pontifical Lateran University in 1971. Sheehan served as assistant general secretary of the United States Conference of Catholic Bishops/United States Catholic Conference from 1971 to 1976, and as rector of Holy Trinity Seminary in Dallas, Texas from 1976 to 1982. In 1982, he was named pastor of Immaculate Conception Parish in Grand Prairie, Texas.

Bishop of Lubbock 
On March 25, 1983, Sheehan was appointed the founding bishop of the Diocese of Lubbock by Pope John Paul II. He received his episcopal consecration on June 17, 1983, from Archbishop Patrick Flores, with Bishops Leroy Matthiesen and Thomas Tschoepe serving as co-consecrators. He selected as his episcopal motto: "Love One Another Constantly."

Following the resignation of Bishop Robert Sanchez, Sheehan became apostolic administrator of the Archdiocese of Santa Fe on April 6, 1993.

Archbishop of Santa Fe
Sheehan was named by John Paul II as the eleventh archbishop of the Archdiocese of Santa Fe on August 17, 1993. He was installed as archbishop on September 21 of that year.

Sheehan became apostolic administrator of the Diocese of Phoenix on June 18, 2003, after Bishop Thomas J. O'Brien resigned. Sheehan resigned as apostolic administrator upon the installation of Bishop Thomas J. Olmsted on December 20, 2003. In addition to his native English, he speaks Italian and Spanish.

On April 27, 2015, Pope Francis accepted Sheehan's resignation as archbishop of Santa Fe.

Views

Pro-choice politicians at Catholic universities
In August 2009, Sheehan decried the attacks by some of his fellow bishops on the University of Notre Dame for having President Barack Obama deliver its commencement speech and receive an honorary degree. Sheehan also said the Catholic community risks isolating itself from the rest of the country and that refusing to talk to a politician or refusing Communion because of a difference on a single issue was counterproductive.

Cohabitation and marriage
Sheehan has been an outspoken opponent of cohabitation and its effects on marriage. He has released letters to his archdiocese in regards to cohabitation. and its effects on children.

See also
 

 Catholic Church hierarchy
 Catholic Church in the United States
 Historical list of the Catholic bishops of the United States
 List of Catholic bishops of the United States
 Lists of patriarchs, archbishops, and bishops

References

External links
Roman Catholic Archdiocese of Santa Fe Official Site

1939 births
Living people
People from Wichita, Kansas
People from Texarkana, Texas
Pontifical Gregorian University alumni
Pontifical Lateran University alumni
Roman Catholic Ecclesiastical Province of San Antonio
Roman Catholic archbishops of Santa Fe
Religious leaders from Texas
Catholics from Texas
Catholics from Kansas